Cider Run is a tributary of Sutton Creek in Luzerne County, Pennsylvania, in the United States. The stream sometimes experiences flooding, but this rarely causes significant damage. Numerous macroinvertebrate species have been observed in the creek.

Course
Cider Run begins in a valley in Franklin Township near the Luzerne County/Wyoming County line. It flows east-northeast for a few tenths of a mile before turning east-southeast. After a few tenths of a mile, it turns south and its valley becomes narrower. Several tenths of a mile further downstream, the stream receives an unnamed tributary from the right and then turns southeast. After several tenths of a mile, it reaches its confluence with Sutton Creek.

Hydrology
The peak annual discharge of Cider Run has a 10 percent chance of reaching . It has a 2 percent chance of reaching  and a 1 percent chance of reaching . The peak annual discharge has a 0.2 percent chance of reaching .

Geography and geology

Watershed
The mouth of the stream is in the United States Geological Survey quadrangle of Ransom. However, its source is in the quadrangle of Center Moreland. The watershed is entirely in Franklin Township, but its northern edge is near the border of Northmoreland Township, Wyoming County.

Cider Run occasionally experiences flooding. However, because its floodplain is sparsely developed, such floods rarely cause significant damage.

History
Cider Run was entered into the Geographic Names Information System on August 2, 1979. Its identifier in the Geographic Names Information System is 1198571.

A bridge carrying Route 1035 over Cider Run was listed by the Pennsylvania Department of Transportation as structurally deficient. Cider Run was surveyed by the Pennsylvania Fish and Boat Commission on January 20, 2015.

Biology
Cider Run is being considered for designation as a wild trout stream by the Pennsylvania Fish and Boat Commission.

There are palustrine forested wetlands along an unnamed tributary to Cider Run.

In a 2012 study, 173 individual macroinvertebrates from 20 taxa were observed on Cider Run. These taxa included four caddisfly genera, three stonefly genera, two beetle genera, and two cranefly genera. Other taxa included the aquatic worm genus Oligochaeta, the crayfish genus Orconectes, the dragonfly genus Aeshna, the hellgrammite genus Corydalus, the riffle beetle genus Dubiraphia, the scud genus Crangonyx, and the midge family Chironomidae.

See also
 List of rivers of Pennsylvania

References

Rivers of Luzerne County, Pennsylvania
Tributaries of the Susquehanna River
Rivers of Pennsylvania